WVPJ-LP (107.9 FM, Radio Sion) is a radio station broadcasting a Religious format. Licensed to Mayagüez, Puerto Rico, the station serves the western Puerto Rico area. The station is currently owned by Milton Cuevas Vazquez through licensee Iglesia Evangelica Sion, Inc.

External links

Radio stations established in 2016
2016 establishments in Puerto Rico
VPJ-LP
VPJ-LP